The Arthur de Buyer Coal Mine, or coal mine #11, was one of the major Ronchamp coal mines, which is in the area of the city Magny-Danigon in the French region of Franche-Comté. Digging started in 1894 to ensure the future of the company (in a difficult position at this time). The project was directed by Leon Poussigue, director of the company since 1891. He was responsible for organizing the excavation, designing buildings and installing each machine. The seat is named to tribute of Arthur de Buyer (the same family of the De Buyer owner), the president since 1876. He retired during the commissioning activity of the mine.

Active from 1900 to the early 1950s, was its depth 1010 meters, making it the deepest mine in France in the early 20th century and the first to pass the symbolic depth of 1,000 meters.

After it had brought coal for almost half a century, there were, up to the 21st century, several conversion attempts. Today only ruins remain. A project to install a solar photovoltaic power plant in the municipality is under study since June 2012.

Pictures

See also

Connected Articles 
 Ronchamp Coal Mines
 Sainte Marie Coal Mine
 Notre-Dame Mine Shaft

External links 

  Les amis du musée de la mine.
  Cartes postales anciennes du Arthur-de-Buyer, Ronchamp au siècle dernier
  Fiche du puits Arthur-de-Buyer van BRGM
 

Coal mines in France
Modern ruins
History articles needing translation from French Wikipedia
Science articles needing translation from French Wikipedia
Featured articles needing translation from French Wikipedia